Amateur film is the low-budget hobbyist art of film practised for passion and enjoyment and not for business purposes.

Organizations
The international organization for amateur film makers is UNICA (Union International du Cinema Non Professionel); in the United States the American Motion Picture Society (AMPS), in Canada the Society of Canadian Cine Amateurs (SCCA), in the UK it is the Institute of Amateur Cinematographers. These organizations arrange annual festivals and conventions. There are several amateur film festivals held annually in the United States, Canada and Europe.

The Cinema Museum in London holds a large collection of amateur films whose details can be accessed on-line.

Creation
Amateur films were usually shot on 16 mm film or on 8 mm film (either Double-8 or Super-8) until the advent of cheap video cameras or digital equipment. The advent of digital video and computer based editing programs greatly expanded the technical quality achievable by the amateur and low-budget filmmaker. Amateur video has become the choice for the low-budget filmmaker and has boomed into a very watched and even produced industry with the use of VHS and digital video camcorders.

Notable films 

A number of amateur films have been added to the National Film Preservation Board's (NFPB) National Film Registry (NFR) including:

 The Augustas (1930s-1950s)
 Tacoma Narrows Bridge Collapse (1940)
 Disneyland Dream (1956)
 Zapruder film (1963)

Further reading 

 Ian Craven (ed.) Movies on Home Ground: Explorations in Amateur Cinema. Cambridge: Cambridge Scholars Publishing.
 Francis Dyson (2012) Challenging assumptions about amateur film of the inter-war years: Ace movies and the first generation of London based cine-clubs. Unpublished PhD thesis, Norwich: University of East Anglia
Karen L. Ishizuka and Patricia Zimmerman (eds.) (2008) Mining the Home Movies: Excavations in Histories and Memories. Berkeley: University of California Press.
Heather Norris Nicholson (2012) Amateur Film: Meaning and Practice, 1927-77. Manchester: Manchester University Press.
Ryan Shand and Ian Craven (eds.) (2013) Small Gauge Storytelling: Discovering the Amateur Fiction Film. Edinburgh University Press.

References

External links 

 Amateur Film Clips 
 Streaming Amateur Film
 Amateur Cinema Project

Film genres
Hobbies
Amateur filmmaking